Jane the Virgin is an American comedy-drama television series that premiered on The CW on October 13, 2014. The series follows Jane Villanueva, a hard-working, religious young Latina woman whose vow to save her virginity until marriage is shattered when a doctor mistakenly artificially inseminates her during a checkup. To make matters worse, the biological donor is a married man, a former playboy and cancer survivor who is not only the new owner of the hotel where Jane works, but was also her former teenage crush. 

The show was ordered to series on May 8, 2014, followed by a full season order on October 21, 2014. On January 11, 2015, the show was renewed for a second season. On March 11, 2016, the show was renewed for a third season. On January 8, 2017, the show was renewed for a fourth season. On April 2, 2018, the show was renewed for a fifth and final season.

During the course of the series, 100 episodes of Jane the Virgin aired over five seasons, between October 13, 2014, and July 31, 2019.

Series overview

Episodes

Season 1 (2014–2015)

Season 2 (2015–2016)

Season 3 (2016–2017)

Season 4 (2017–2018)

Season 5 (2019)

Ratings

Notes

References

External links

 
 

Lists of American comedy-drama television series episodes